Lee Dae-myung (born 14 September 1988) is a South Korean sport shooter. He won a silver medal in the men's 50 m free pistol at the 2010 ISSF World Shooting Championships in Munich, Germany, accumulating a score of 665.2 targets. He also captured two more gold medals for air pistol shooting at the 2010 Asian Games in Guangzhou, China, and at the 2012 ISSF World Cup in Sydney, Australia, with scores of 685.8 and 691.3 points, respectively.

Lee represented South Korea at the 2008 Summer Olympics in Beijing, where he competed in two pistol shooting events, along with his teammate Jin Jong-Oh. He scored a total of 580 targets in the preliminary rounds of the men's 10 m air pistol, by one point behind Uzbekistan's Dilshod Mukhtarov from the final attempt, finishing only in sixteenth place. Three days later, Lee placed twenty-sixth in his second event, 50 m pistol, by four points ahead of North Korea's Ryu Myong-Yon from the fifth attempt, with a total score of 551 targets.

References

External links

Lee Dae-myung at 2018 Asian Games
NBC 2008 Olympics profile

South Korean male sport shooters
Living people
Olympic shooters of South Korea
Shooters at the 2008 Summer Olympics
Shooters at the 2016 Summer Olympics
Asian Games medalists in shooting
1988 births
Shooters at the 2006 Asian Games
Shooters at the 2010 Asian Games
Shooters at the 2014 Asian Games
Asian Games gold medalists for South Korea
Asian Games silver medalists for South Korea
Medalists at the 2006 Asian Games
Medalists at the 2010 Asian Games
Medalists at the 2014 Asian Games
Universiade medalists in shooting
Medalists at the 2018 Asian Games
Shooters at the 2018 Asian Games
Korea National Sport University alumni
ISSF pistol shooters
Sport shooters from Seoul
Universiade gold medalists for South Korea
Medalists at the 2013 Summer Universiade
20th-century South Korean people
21st-century South Korean people